Jack Anthony may refer to:

Jack Anthony (hurler) (1886–1964), Kilkenny sportsperson
Jack Anthony (jockey) (1890–1954), Welsh champion jockey
Jack Anthony (musician) (born 1982), American singer-songwriter, composer and musician
Jack Anthony (footballer) (born 1988), Australian rules football player in the Australian Football League
Jack Anthony (wrestler) (born 1990), English professional wrestler

See also
John Anthony (disambiguation)